Bremen was a blockade-breaking German merchant submarine of World War I. Developed with private funds and operated by the Norddeutscher Lloyd Line, she was one of the first of seven U-151-class U-boats built and one of only two used as unarmed cargo submarines.

Construction
Bremen was built together with her sister ship  in 1916 for Deutsche Ozean-Reederei, a private shipping company created for the purpose, a subsidiary company of the North German Lloyd shipping company (now Hapag-Lloyd) and Deutsche Bank. She was constructed without armaments, with a wide beam to provide space for cargo. The cargo capacity was 700 tons (much of it outside the pressure hull), relatively small compared to surface ships.

Bremen was one of seven submarines designed to carry cargo between the United States and Germany in 1916, through the naval blockade of the Entente Powers. Mainly enforced by Great Britain's Royal Navy, the blockade had led to great difficulties for German companies in acquiring raw materials which could not be found in quantity within the German sphere of influence, and thus substantially hindered the German war effort.

Five of the submarine freighters were converted into long-range cruiser U-boats (U-kreuzers) equipped with two  deck guns, and only two were completed according to the original design: Deutschland and Bremen.

Maiden voyage and disappearance
Bremen departed Bremerhaven in September 1916 for Norfolk, Virginia, commanded by Kapitänleutnant Karl Schwartzkopf, and reportedly carrying financial credits for Simon Lake to begin building cargo submarines for Germany. She did not complete this voyage and her fate is a mystery. Several views have been put forth as to the nature of her fate.

German U-boat U-53 had been assigned to join Bremen as protection against British attacks but failed to make contact. Its commander Hans Rose reported having heard a radio broadcast on 28 September 1916 stating that Bremen had been sunk.

A life preserver marked "Bremen" was found in Maiden Cove at Cape Elizabeth, Maine, on September 29, 1916. The submarine had been expected to arrive on the Atlantic Seaboard for at least a week. Stamped on the canvas covering was Shutz-Marke, a small crown, and "V-Epping-Hoven, Willhelms-haven." Although in new condition and not long in the water, the life preserver was stained with oil.

However, Mantuas log makes no mention of this, so it appears to be a myth.

Another source states that Bremen was sunk by British submarine . In March 1917, G13 was on patrol off Shetland, covering the exit by U-boats from the North Sea. There she sighted a submarine identified as Bremen, and fired two torpedoes, which both missed. Turning, G13 fired again, first with her starboard beam, and continuing her turn with her port beam torpedoes; both these also missed. The Admiralty, however, felt this was inconclusive, and withheld credit for the hit.

Yet another source regards her as lost, probably as a result of hitting a mine.
In the absence of any firm evidence, the cause of Bremen's loss remains a mystery.

Notes

References

External links
 

1916 ships
German Type U 151 submarines
Merchant submarines
Maritime incidents in 1916
Missing submarines
Ships built in Flensburg
World War I merchant ships of Germany
World War I shipwrecks in the Atlantic Ocean
World War I submarines of Germany